Hydra (F-452) (Greek Φ/Γ Ύδρα) is the lead ship of the Greek  and flagship of the Hellenic Navy.  The ship was built in the same shipyard as the Blohm + Voss MEKO 200 frigate class, on which its design was based. Three more vessels were built by Hellenic Shipyards Co. at Skaramagas in following years. It is the fifth ship in the Hellenic Navy to bear the name Hydra.

Hydra was the first of four frigates of the MEKO 200 type (the four being Hydra, and ) ordered by the Greek government. The ship was delivered to the Hellenic Navy on 15 October 1992 and first sailed in Greek waters on 28 January 1993. The crest of the frigate Hydra is the same as that of her predecessor. It is based on one of the flags which the ships of Hydra sailed under during the 1821 revolution.

In April 1988, the Hellenic Navy proposed and approved the four frigates of the MEKO 200 type in an effort to modernize its fleet. After a lengthy negotiation process, the following contracts were signed to fulfill the program:
 A contract with ΜΕΚΟ Consortium (MC), Blohm + Voss AG and Thyssen Rheinstahl Technik to build the frigate in Germany.
 A second contract with MEKO Consortium to supply parts to Hellenic Shipyards to build the other three Hydra-class frigates in Scaramanga, Greece
On 12 May 2020, Hydra sailed off from her port in Salamis Island to participate in Operation Irini, however the ship was damaged due to unknown reasons and had to be replaced by another ship of the same class, Spetsai.

References

External links
Official Hellenic Navy page for Hydra Class Frigates (English)

1991 ships
Hydra-class frigates
Ships built in Hamburg
Frigates of Greece